See China and Die (released in Europe as Hearsay) is a 1981 television film written, produced and directed by Larry Cohen.

Premise
A maid who reads detective stories finds herself embroiled in a real life mystery involving her dead boss and a mysterious statue he brought back from China. She acts as an amateur sleuth to solve the murder of her employer.

Cast
Esther Rolle as Momma Sykes
Kene Holliday as Sgt. Alvin Sykes
Frank Converse as Tom Hackman
Paul Dooley as Ames Prescott
Andrew Duggan as Edwin Forbes
Laurence Luckinbill as Dr. Glickman
Jean Marsh as Sally Hackman
Fritz Weaver as Poston
Jane Hitchcock as Ruth
Claude Brooks as Jessie Sykes
William Walker II as Andy Sykes
Miguel Pinero as Gonzalez
James Dukas as Transplant

Production
The film was originally produced as a pilot for a mystery/crime series starring Esther Rolle called Momma the Detective, but the show never materialized.

References

External links

1981 television films
1981 films
1981 thriller films
Television pilots not picked up as a series
Films about murder
Maids in films
American thriller television films
Films directed by Larry Cohen
Films with screenplays by Larry Cohen
NBC network original films
1980s English-language films
1980s American films